Laurence Edward Adams (born 14 February 1931) is an English former footballer, who played for Watford as an inside left. Born in Barnet (then part of Hertfordshire), he made his sole Football League appearance while doing his National Service. Under the management of Haydn Green, Adams played a full match on 23 February 1952, as Watford defeated Walsall 2–0 in front of a crowd of 8,909 at Vicarage Road. He turned professional upon leaving the army, but did not play another senior game, and left the club at the end of the 1952–53 season. Although at that time professional players were not normally allowed to play amateur football again, Adams subsequently played for Whipton as a permit player in 1955.

References 

Living people
1931 births
Watford F.C. players
English Football League players
English footballers
Association football inside forwards